The siege of Ostend took place during the War of the Spanish Succession. In the wake of the Allied victory over the French at the Battle of Ramillies in May 1706, town and cities across the Spanish Netherlands rapidly surrendered to the Duke of Marlborough's victorious forces often without a fight. Ostend, a port on the North Sea coast, offered more resistance.

Determined not to "give the enemy any breathing space", Marlborough detached Dutch and British forces under Henry de Nassau, Lord Overkirk and Duke of Argyle  to deal with it. Meanwhile he established his main army at Roeselare as a covering force to protect the siege operations from the French army which had regrouped at Courtrai to the south.

Naval support for the besiegers came from a Royal Navy squadron under Sir Stafford Fairborne. Fairborne used bomb ketches to fire on the town, setting it alight. After a three week siege Ostend capitulated. In the wake of Ostend's fall, Marlborough was offered the Governor Generalship of the Spanish Netherlands but was forced to decline it for fear of offending his Dutch allies.

References

Bibliography
 Falkner, James. The War of the Spanish Succession 1701-1714. Pen and Sword, 2015.
 Webb, Stephen Saunders. Marlborough's America. Yale University Press, 2013.
 

Ostend
Osdend
Ostend
Battles of the War of the Spanish Succession
1706 in Europe
Conflicts in 1706
Sieges of the War of the Spanish Succession